Michaela Kudláčková (born 21 August 1968 in Prague) is a former Czech child actress. She starred in the film Poslední propadne peklu under director Ludvík Ráža in 1982.

References

External links

Czech child actresses
1968 births
Living people
Czech film actresses
20th-century Czech actresses
Actresses from Prague